Community One Federal Credit Union was a Las Vegas, Nevada based state chartered credit union.

America First Federal Credit Union acquired Community One Federal Credit Union on August 12, 2009, following its closure by the National Credit Union Administration.  At the time of closing, the credit union served 21,098 members. Community One was the second credit union to close in Clark County, Nevada, during 2009.

Failure
The credit union failed following extensive losses driven by the local economic problems.

Notes 

Companies based in Las Vegas
Banks established in 1960
Banks disestablished in 2009
Credit unions based in Nevada